This article details St Helens rugby league football club's 2022 season. This is the Saints' 26th consecutive season in the Super League.

Table

2022 squad

2022 transfers in/out

Gains

Losses

References

External links
Rugby League Project - Super League XXVII 2022 - St Helens

St Helens R.F.C. seasons
Super League XXVII by club